Balutungi is a village in Lalgola CD Block in Lalbag subdivision of Murshidabad district in West Bengal.

Geography
Balutungi is bordered by four villages: in the east by Airmari, in the west by Fudhkipara and Basupara, in the north by Madhupur, and in the south by Dhulauri.

Neighbourhoods
Balutugi is divided in 3 major divisions.
Bhatupara (at the very south)
Siropara (at the very north)
Majhpara (at the middle)

There are also 2 minor divisions:
Hindu para (at the north-east side)
Kamarpara (at the north)

The Hindus live at Hindu para.

Transport
SH 11A, running from Bhagawangola to Raghunathganj passes through Balutungi.

Education
Balutungi High School was established in 1951.

Balutungi Junior Girls' High School was established in 1968.

References

Villages in Murshidabad district